Julius Weinberger (July 22, 1893, New York – June, 1978) was a radio engineer and inventor, credited with over 70 patents for radio devices. He authored or co-authored a number of scientific articles in radio journals. He was also a parapsychologist.

After earning his Bachelor of Science from City College of New York in 1913, he worked for 42 years at the Radio Corporation of America (RCA) in various positions between 1916 and 1958, eventually being in charge of technical radio research for the RCA Photophone.

In later years, Weinberger delved into parapsychology and reflected upon a variety of related topics, including communicating with the dead via radio using a Venus flytrap as the medium. As a result, scientific skeptic Paul Kurtz wrote in the Skeptical Inquirer of February, 1978 that "Most likely, the Uri award with distinction should be awarded to Julius Weinberger", referring to the tongue-in-cheek "Uri Award", later realized as the Pigasus award.

References 

1893 births
1978 deaths
20th-century American engineers
American parapsychologists
American consciousness researchers and theorists
American inventors
Wireless energy transfer